Nathanaël Hlemu (born 22 August 1998) is a New Caledonian international footballer who plays as a goalkeeper for the New Caledonia Super Ligue side Gaïtcha FCN.

Career statistics

International

References

1998 births
Living people
New Caledonian footballers
New Caledonia international footballers
Association football goalkeepers
Gaïtcha FCN players